The Williams FW14 is a Formula One car designed by Adrian Newey, used by the Williams team during the 1991 and 1992 Formula One seasons.

Overview
The car was born out of necessity, as the 1989 and 1990 seasons had proven competitive for Williams, but they had underachieved in their own and Renault's eyes. Newey started work on the new car soon after joining the team from March in mid-1990. He had designed a series of aerodynamically efficient and very effective cars for March on a limited budget, so with Williams's greater resources and money he was able to fully develop his ideas. The all-new design (with the exception of the engine) showed enough promise to tempt Nigel Mansell to shelve his plans to retire from the sport and rejoin Williams from Ferrari.

Powered by a 3.5-litre V10 Renault engine with its design and development led by Bernard Dudot, the car is considered one of the most technologically sophisticated to have competed in Formula One. By 1992 the FW14B featured semi-automatic transmission, active suspension, traction control and, for a brief period, anti-lock brakes. With the aerodynamics as designed by Newey and the active suspension invented by  designer/aerodynamicist Frank Dernie, the car was far ahead of its competitors, such as the McLaren MP4/7A, Ferrari F92A or Lotus 107, and it made for a strong package. The FW14B was so successful that its successor (the FW15), which was available mid-season in 1992, was never used.

Williams FW14 

The FW14 made its debut at the 1991 United States Grand Prix. The car was the most technically advanced car in competition, but various difficulties during the season stymied the team's early progress. Nigel Mansell and Riccardo Patrese recorded 7 victories between them but the Drivers' Championship was wrapped up by Ayrton Senna in the McLaren MP4/6, which had better reliability.

Williams had the faster car throughout the balance of the season and it provided a run of good form in the midseason for both Mansell and Patrese. Mansell, in particular, had several retirements due to the then new-for-Williams semi-automatic transmission, with most of these retirements occurring while in a position to win races. Patrese was impressive on several occasions and retired while leading twice. McLaren's superior reliability told in the Constructors' Championship as well, as they narrowly took the title from Williams.

A total of 5 chassis were built.

Williams FW14B 

In 1992, after further development work was done to the gearbox and aerodynamics, and electronics technology such as a traction control and active suspension system were added, the B-spec. FW14, known as the FW14B was introduced for the 1992 season. The FW14B was the dominant car that year and Mansell wrapped up the 1992 Drivers' Championship with a then-record 9 wins in a season, whilst Patrese scored a further win at the Japanese Grand Prix. Patrese did not warm to the car as much as the FW14, as he preferred the passive suspension in that chassis, whereas the increased level of downforce generated by the FW14B suited Mansell's aggressive driving style much better. The main visible difference between the FW14 and FW14B were a pair of bulbous protrusions above the latter's front pushrods, which contained the active suspension technology. The FW14B also featured a longer nose section. The car had been present at the Australian Grand Prix the previous year, but Mansell had elected to use the regular FW14 in that race.

The result was that there were many races in the 1992 season where Mansell and Patrese would gain 2 seconds per lap on the rest of the field, especially in the early laps, which made the FW14B far superior to even the next best car, the McLaren MP4/7A. Another example of Williams's dominance that year was at qualifying at the British Grand Prix at Silverstone, where Mansell's pole position-winning lap was a whole 2 seconds faster than Patrese, who in turn was a second faster than 3rd placed Ayrton Senna. Williams were clear winners of the 1992 Constructors' Championship, but the season ended in acrimony as Mansell left the team after Alain Prost was signed, while Patrese moved to Benetton for his swansong season in 1993.

Both versions of the FW14 won a combined 17 Grands Prix, 21 pole positions, and 289 points before being replaced with the FW15C for 1993. Given that current F1 regulations ban many of the technologies used by the FW14B and FW15C, these are considered among the most technologically advanced racing cars to have ever raced in Formula One.

On 2 June 2017, the Williams F1 team celebrated 40 years in Formula One with a media day at Silverstone race circuit. The FW14B was driven for the first time since 1992 for a number of laps by Karun Chandhok. The car did several laps on its own around the circuit; it then performed 3 laps accompanying the 2014 Williams FW36 driven by Paul di Resta.

A total of 6 chassis were built. The numbering continued from the FW14, so FW14B serial numbers 6 through 11 were built.

In 2020, it was revealed that Sebastian Vettel bought Nigel Mansell's no. 5 FW14B, the same chassis that won the 1992 F1 world title.

Cultural legacy
The Williams FW14B appears in the video game F1 2013 as part of the "F1 Classics" downloadable content. In May 2017, Codemasters announced that the car will appear in F1 2017 as one of the classic cars. It also appears in F1 2018, and F1 2019.

On 5 July 2019, the Williams FW14B chassis number FW14/8 was sold for £2,703,000.00 at auction by Bonhams at the 2019 Goodwood Festival of Speed.

Complete Formula One results
(key) (results shown in bold indicate pole position; results in italics indicate fastest lap)

References 

Williams Formula One cars
1992 Formula One season cars
Formula One championship-winning cars